Santísima Trinidad (officially named Nuestra Señora de la Santísima Trinidad by royal order on 12 March 1768, nicknamed La Real, sometimes confused with the galleon Santísima Trinidad y Nuestra Señora del Buen Fin) was a Spanish first-rate ship of the line with 112 guns. This was increased in 1795–96 to 130 guns by closing in the spar deck between the quarterdeck and forecastle, and to 136 guns around 1802 (plus 4 small guns on the poop), thus creating what was in effect a continuous fourth gundeck although the extra guns added were actually relatively small. She was the heaviest-armed ship in the world when rebuilt, and bore the most guns of any ship of the line outfitted in the Age of Sail.

Design and construction

She was built at Havana, Cuba, to a design by Irish naval architect Matthew Mullan (domiciled in Spain under the name Mateo Mullán), originally intended as a ship of 112 guns. He died on 25 November 1767, and the construction of the ship was continued by his son, Ignacio Mullán. and the ship was launched in March 1769 and completed in August 1769 as a 116-gun three-decker. She was considerably larger than her British contemporary Victory and somewhat bigger than the French Bretagne.

There is no complete plan of the ship in existence, but there are of the 112-gun ship from 1765, from which the original dimensions of the ship may be found.  Here, the units of length are the Spanish Burgos foot (27.86 cm) and the SI metre (100 cm), respectively:  length = 213 (59.53); keel = 182 (50.82); beam = 57 (16.09); draught = 28 (8.06).

She was reputed to be the largest warship in the world, for which she was nicknamed El Escorial de los mares by the Spanish, until surpassed in sheer size by the new type French 120-gun ships such as Océan (1790) and Orient (1791).  In 1795, her forecastle was joined to her quarterdeck to create a fourth deck containing a battery of eight pounder guns, giving her a total of 130 guns. Her armament seems to have been quickly reduced to 130 from 136 guns, but she still carried more guns than any other ship of her time.

The weight of the additional guns, so high above her waterline, made her poor sailing qualities even worse, leading to her nickname, El Ponderoso. It was even suggested by some naval officers that she should be restricted to defending the Bay of Cádiz.

Santísima Trinidad remains notable as one of the few four-decker ships of the line ever built. The U.S. Navy constructed the four-deck, 136-gun  and the French, the 120-gun Valmy, (both with similar flush deck arrangement). The Royal Navy planned — but did not build — the 170-gun four-decker Duke of Kent.

Service
In July 1779, Spain declared war on Great Britain, joining France in support of the American colonists in the American War of Independence. Santísima Trinidad became the flagship of the Spanish fleet, taking part in the Franco-Spanish operations in the English Channel in the late summer of that year.

On 12 August 1780 she took part in the capture of 55 merchant ships from a convoy of 63, escorted by the ship of the line HMS Ramillies and three frigates. In 1782 she was incorporated into the Mediterranean Squadron, participating in the Great Siege of Gibraltar and she fought in the brief and indecisive Battle of Cape Spartel.  In 1795, she was modified by the addition of extra 8-pounder guns on a new deck between her forecastle and quarterdeck.

In 1797, she was the flagship of Teniente General José de Córdoba y Ramos, the Spanish commander, at Battle of Cape St Vincent on 14 February 1797, where she was badly damaged and nearly captured by the British fleet. She was first in action with the British ship Captain (74), commanded by Commodore Nelson, and Culloden (74). She was then attacked by the Blenheim (90), Orion (74), Irresistible (74) and Excellent (74). By now she was severely damaged, having lost all her masts and with half of her crew killed or wounded. She struck her colours, but the British failed to take possession and she was saved by the Infante don Pelayo (74) and Príncipe de Asturias (112). Several days later, Santísima Trinidad was spotted, still damaged, making her way back to Spain, and engaged by the 32-gun frigate  under Captain Richard Bowen, but she escaped. She eventually returned to Cadiz for repairs.

Eight years later, commanded by Francisco Javier Uriarte and the flagship of Rear Admiral Baltasar Hidalgo de Cisneros, she took part in the Battle of Trafalgar on October 21, 1805, as part of the combined Franco-Spanish fleet. Due to her great bulk, her helm was unresponsive in the light winds on the day, contributing to her ineffective service in the combined fleet's cause.  Her great size and position immediately ahead of the fleet flagship Bucentaure made her a target for the British fleet, and she came under concentrated attack by several ships. She lost her mast and eventually surrendered to the Neptune, a 98-gun second rate commanded by Captain Thomas Fremantle. She was taken in tow by the 98-gun second rate Prince, but was eventually scuttled by her British captors northwest of Cádiz.

It is possible that her wreck was found by coincidence during testing of a new sidescan sonar of the Spanish Navy, in 2009. An earlier attempt to find her wreck was inconclusive as lack of visual evidence could not confirm the identity of the ships found.

Replicas

A full-size representation of the Santísima Trinidad can be seen and visited in the harbour of Alicante, in Spain. 

A non-profit non-governmental Canadian association, the Friends of Santísima Trinidad, assisted the Office of the Historian of the City of Havana, Cuba with the construction of a new 1:25 four-metre-long scale model of La Santísima Trinidad.  Interior construction details are exposed on one side of the vessel, and visitors are able to use a computer interface and touch screen to take a virtual tour of the ship in Spanish, English, and French.  The model is displayed in the Naval Museum of La Habana, opened in June 2008 at Castillo de la Real Fuerza, the oldest building in Cuba and the oldest stone fortress in the New World.

Notes

Sources and references

Further reading

John D. Harbron Trafalgar and the Spanish Navy (1988) 
José Cayuela Fernandez – Trafalgar, hombres y naves entre dos épocas – Ariel (Barcelona) 2004

External links

More info with pictures of models
Website of the Canadian non-profit association, pictures of the construction of the model, history facts and other events 

1769 ships
Maritime incidents in 1805
Replica ships
Ships built in Cuba
Ships of the line of the Spanish Navy
Shipwrecks in the Atlantic Ocean
Scuttled vessels